Stalingrad, is a 1943 Soviet documentary film directed by Leonid Varlamov.

Plot 
The film illustrates the famous battle of the Red Army with the Germans for Stalingrad.

References

External links 
 

1943 films
1940s Russian-language films
Films about the Battle of Stalingrad
Soviet documentary films
1943 documentary films
Soviet black-and-white films
Black-and-white documentary films